Pentyl butyrate, also known as pentyl butanoate or amyl butyrate, is an ester that is formed when pentanol is reacted with butyric acid, usually in the presence of sulfuric acid as a catalyst.   This ester has a smell reminiscent of pear or apricot. This chemical is used as an additive in cigarettes.

References

Flavors
Butyrate esters